Pahnavar (also Romanized as Pahnāvar, Pehnāvar, and Pahnvar; also known as Pahnāvar Kord Aḩmad and Pegnarar) is a village in Nowjeh Mehr Rural District, Siah Rud District, Jolfa County, East Azerbaijan Province, Iran. At the 2006 census, its population was 118, in 29 families.

References 

Populated places in Jolfa County